The 2017–18 LEB Oro season was the 22nd season of the Spanish basketball second league. It started on 29 September 2017 with the first round of the regular season and ended on 12 June 2018 with the final.

Cafés Candelas Breogán won the league and promoted to Liga ACB twelve years after.

Teams

Promotion and relegation (pre-season)
A total of 18 teams contested the league, including 14 sides from the 2016–17 season, two relegated from the 2016–17 ACB and two promoted from the 2016–17 LEB Plata. On July 18, 2017, CB Clavijo achieved the vacant of Sáenz Horeca Araberri. On August 30, 2017, Sáenz Horeca Araberri achieved the vacant generated after the inclusion of Real Betis Energía Plus in Liga ACB.

Teams relegated from Liga ACB
Real Betis Energía Plus
ICL Manresa

Teams promoted from LEB PlataSammic Hostelería
Carramimbre CBC Valladolid

Venues and locations

Personnel and sponsorship

Managerial changes

Regular season

League table

Positions by round
The table lists the positions of teams after completion of each round. In order to preserve chronological evolvements, any postponed matches are not included in the round at which they were originally scheduled, but added to the full round they were played immediately afterwards. For example, if a match is scheduled for round 13, but then postponed and played between rounds 16 and 17, it will be added to the standings for round 16.
Source: FEB

Results

Playoffs

Source: FEB

Copa Princesa de Asturias
The Copa Princesa de Asturias was played on 3 February 2018, by the two first qualified teams after the end of the first half of the season (round 17). The champion of the cup play the playoffs as first qualified if it finishes the league between the second and the fifth qualified.

Teams qualified

Game

Final standings

Individual statistics
Points

Source: FEB

Rebounds

Source: FEB

Assists

Source: FEB

Efficiency

Source: FEB

Awards
All official awards of the 2017–18 LEB Oro season'''.

MVP

Source:

All-LEB Oro Team

Source:

Best Coach

Source:

Player of the round

Source: FEB

References and notes

External links
 Official website 

LEB
LEB Oro seasons
Second level Spanish basketball league seasons
2017–18 in European second tier basketball leagues